Rajeev Ram and Joe Salisbury  defeated Nikola Mektić and Mate Pavić in the final, 7–6(7–4), 6–4  to win
the doubles tennis title at the 2022 ATP Finals. It was their first ATP Finals title. Salisbury became the first Briton to win an ATP Finals doubles title. By staying undefeated, the champions also claimed $930,300, the biggest doubles payout in history.

Pierre-Hugues Herbert and Nicolas Mahut were the reigning champions, but did not qualify this year.

Wesley Koolhof and Neal Skupski jointly secured the year-end individual doubles No. 1 ranking after winning their first round robin match. Ram was also in contention for the year-end top ranking at the beginning of the tournament.

Seeds

Alternates

Draw

Finals

Green group

Red group 

Standings are determined by: 1. number of wins; 2. number of matches; 3. in two-teams-ties, head-to-head records; 4. in three-teams-ties, percentage of sets won, then percentage of games won; 5. ATP rankings.

References

External links 
Official website
Group standings
Doubles draw

Doubles